The 2006 Pakistan landmine blast occurred on 10 March 2006, in the Pakistani city of Dera Bugti in Balochistan province. 26 people were killed and seven were injured when their car, on the way to a wedding, hit at least one anti-tank landmine. Raziq Bugti, a spokesman for the Baluchistan provincial government, said the mine was planted by rebels working for the tribal chief Nawab Akbar Bugti and that most of the victims were "women and children. Seven people were injured... there could have been more than one land mine but we have not confirmed that at this stage".

References

2006 murders in Pakistan
21st-century mass murder in Pakistan
Landmine blast
Mine action
Landmine victims
Government of Shaukat Aziz
History of Balochistan, Pakistan (1947–present)
Terrorist incidents in Pakistan in 2006
Insurgency in Balochistan